Biên Hòa ) is a former province of South Vietnam originally formed in 1832 containing areas of Đồng Nai province, Bà Rịa–Vũng Tàu province and Bình Phước province with total area of over 17.000 km2.

In 1876 it was split to Bien Hoa, Thủ Dầu Một and Bà Rịa. On October 22, 1956, it was split to Bien Hoa, Long Khánh, Phước Long, Bình Long. On May 2, 1957, it contained four districts, Châu Thành Biên Hòa, Long Thành, Dĩ An and Tân Uyên. On January 23, 1959, Tân Uyên was separated and the rest became Phước Thành province.

Former provinces of Vietnam
States and territories established in 1832
Southeast (Vietnam)